Thomae may refer to:

People
Carl Johannes Thomae (1840-1921), German mathematician
Stephan Thomae (born 1968), German politician

Biota
Adaina thomae, a moth species
Batocera thomae, a beetle species
Plusiodonta thomae, a moth species of the genus Plusiodonta
Bursa rhodostoma thomae, a sea snail subspecies of Bursa rhodostoma

Synonyms
Bursa thomae, a synonym of Bursa rhodostoma thomae
Ranella thomae, a synonym of Bursa rhodostoma

Other
Thomae's function, a mathematical function in calculus